The 2007–08 Eredivisie season was the 48th season of the Eredivisie in basketball, the highest professional basketball league in the Netherlands. MyGuide Amsterdam won their 6th national title.

Regular season

1 In January, Omniworld Almere was expelled from the competition after the club went bankrupt.

Playoffs

Individual awards 

 Most Valuable Player: Peter van Paassen (MyGuide Amsterdam)
 Coach of the Year: Erik Braal (West-Brabant Giants)
 Statistical Player of the Year: Ashley Champion (BS Weert)
 Rookie of the Year: Jeroen Slor (Rotterdam Challengers)
 MVP Under-23: Arvin Slagter (West-Brabant Giants)
 First-team All-Eredivisie:
 Patrick Pope (West-Brabant Giants)
 Teddy Gipson (MyGuide Amsterdam)
 Antoine Jordan (Matrixx Magixx)
 Tyler Smith (Matrixx Magixx)
 Peter van Paassen (MyGuide Amsterdam)
 All-Defensive Team:
 Jimmy Woudstra (Punch Delft)
 Vic Bartolome (Leiden)
 Steven Bravard (Den Bosch)
 Jimmy Moore (Arke Stars Enschede)
 Pete Miller (Donar)

References

Dutch Basketball League seasons
1
Netherlands